Hoefler Text is an old-style serif font by Jonathan Hoefler and released by Apple Computer Inc. (now Apple Inc.) in 1991 to showcase advanced type technologies. Intended as a versatile font that is suitable for body text, it takes cues from a range of classic fonts, such as Janson and Garamond (Jean Jannon's design). 

A version of Hoefler Text has been included with every version of the classic Mac OS since System 7.5 and in every version of macOS. Hoefler's company, Hoefler&Co., have continued development of the typeface, developing for sale a range of additional variants. 

Released free with every Mac during the growth of desktop publishing, at a time when producing printed documents was becoming dramatically easier, Hoefler Text raised awareness of type features previously the concern only of professional printers. New York magazine commented in 2014 that it "helped launch a thousand font obsessives." Hoefler Text was used in the Wikipedia logo until the 2010 redesign, when it was replaced with Linux Libertine.

Features 
Hoefler Text incorporates then-advanced features which have since become standard practice for font designers, such as automatic ligature insertion, real small capitals, optional old style figures and optional insertion of characters such as true superscript and subscript characters, the historical round and long s, engraved capitals and swashes. Hoefler Text also has a matching ornament font containing arabesque motifs. It was, until OpenType made alternate characters more common, one of only a few system fonts that contained old style, or ranging, figures, which are designed to harmonize with body text.

Hoefler&Co. expanded Hoefler Text to include additional typographic features, and the current commercial release now includes three weights (an additional bold weight beside the regular and black included with Macs) and two sets of engraved capitals, as well as the more slender display variant Hoefler Titling. These are released in the OpenType format, intended for cross-platform usage.

Gallery

See also 
 Apple Advanced Typography

References

External links 
 
 Hoefler Text in the Hoefler & Frere-Jones catalog
 Hoefler Text features in the Hoefler & Frere-Jones catalog
 Hoefler Titling in the Hoefler & Frere-Jones catalog

Old style serif typefaces
Typefaces with text figures
Hoefler & Frere-Jones typefaces
Typefaces designed by Jonathan Hoefler
Typefaces with optical sizes
Typefaces and fonts introduced in 1991
Apple Inc. typefaces